"Christmas Canon" is a Christmas song by the Trans-Siberian Orchestra (TSO) from their 1998 album The Christmas Attic.

The song is set to the tune of Johann Pachelbel's Canon in D Major with new lyrics added. The style is a departure from TSO's usual rock arrangements, instead being performed in the style of a children's choir with light accompaniment from piano and strings. The group would later create a rock version of the song, entitled "Christmas Canon Rock" with Jennifer Cella on lead vocals, which debuted on their 2004 album The Lost Christmas Eve.

As of November 25, 2016, total sales of the digital track stand at 918,000 downloads according to Nielsen SoundScan, placing it seventh on the list of all-time best-selling Christmas/holiday digital singles in SoundScan history.

Chart history

See also
"What Child Is This?", a Christmas song based on the classical piece "Greensleeves"

References

1998 singles
Lava Records singles
Trans-Siberian Orchestra songs
1998 songs
American Christmas songs